The part of the Latvian fleet that fought for the Allies in World War II under the flag of Latvia consisted of eight freighters: Abagra, Ciltvaira, Regent, Everasma, Everalda, Everelza, Ķegums, and Everagra. Only Everagra and Ķegums survived the war.

After the USSR occupied Latvia on June 17, 1940, and the country was annexed to the Soviet Union, the Soviet authorities issued orders for Latvian merchant navy ships to return home. Some of the ships obeyed (e.g. Hercogs Jēkabs) and some of their crews were deported to Gulag labor camps. The eight ships denied the order.

The town of Nags Head, North Carolina, USA, has a street named after Ciltvaira, which was the first Latvian ship sunk by Germans. It was torpedoed by German submarine U-123 in nearby coastal waters on 19 January 1942. The same year five more ships were sunk: the Everasma on February 28, the Abgara on May 6, the Regent on June 14, the Everalda on June 29, the Everelza on August 13. The Everagra was torpedoed on July 8, 1943, but survived and served until 1957. Ķegums served until 1948.

See also 
 Krišjānis Valdemārs (icebreaker)
 Irish Mercantile Marine during World War II
 Nortraship

References

Military history of Latvia during World War II
Merchant navy